The white-bibbed swallow (Hirundo nigrita), also known as the white-throated blue swallow, is a species of bird in the family Hirundinidae.  It is found in Angola, Benin, Cameroon, Central African Republic, Republic of the Congo, Democratic Republic of the Congo, Ivory Coast, Equatorial Guinea, Gabon, Ghana, Guinea, Guinea-Bissau, Liberia, Nigeria, Sierra Leone, and Uganda.

References

white-bibbed swallow
Birds of Central Africa
Birds of West Africa
white-bibbed swallow
white-bibbed swallow
Taxonomy articles created by Polbot